Thomas Chisholm (April 12, 1842 – October 1, 1931) was a Canadian physician and politician.

Born in Glen Williams, Halton County, Canada West, the son of John Chisholm and Jane McClure, he graduated from the University of Toronto School of Medicine in 1879. He was principal of Public Schools at Belwood and Waterdown, Ontario. He was a lecturer in the Faculty of Medicine in the University of Western Ontario in London, Ontario.

He was first elected to the House of Commons of Canada for the electoral district of Huron East in the general elections of 1904. A Conservative, he was re-elected in 1908 and did not run in 1911.

References
 
 The Canadian Parliament; biographical sketchesT and photo-engravures of the senators and members of the House of Commons of Canada. Being the tenth Parliament, elected November 3, 1904

1842 births
1931 deaths
Conservative Party of Canada (1867–1942) MPs
Members of the House of Commons of Canada from Ontario
University of Toronto alumni
Academic staff of the University of Western Ontario